Milan Ftáčnik (30 October 1956 – 13 May 2021) was a Slovak politician,  Minister of Education of the Slovak Republic from 1998 to 2002 and Mayor of Bratislava from 2010 to 2014. He was also a teacher at the Department of Applied Informatics at the Faculty of Mathematics, Physics and Informatics of Comenius University in Bratislava.

Ftáčnik was often described as a left-wing politician.

He was the older brother of chess grandmaster Ľubomír Ftáčnik.

References 

1956 births
2021 deaths
Mayors of Bratislava
Candidates for President of Slovakia
Comenius University alumni
Academic staff of Comenius University
Members of the National Council (Slovakia) 1992-1994
Members of the National Council (Slovakia) 1994-1998
Education ministers of Slovakia